Cattleya porphyroglossa is a species of Cattleya found in Brazil

References

External links

porphyroglossa